Ramón Alfredo Muttis (12 March 1899 – 12 January 1955) was an Argentine football defender who spent most of his career with Boca Juniors. He also played for the Argentina national team winning the 1925 South American Championship.

Muttis (sometimes recorded as Mutis) started his career with Argentine club Wanderers, in 1920 he joined Club Atlético Atlanta where he was part of the team that won the Copa de Honor in 1920.

Muttis joined Boca Juniors in 1923, the same year that he made his international debut. He won a total of 9 championships with the club. Muttis made a total of 237 appearances for Boca Juniors, spanning ten seasons earning the nickname "Ramón el Fuerte (Ramón the Strong)". 

Muttis played in two editions of the Copa América, winning the tournament in 1925 and finishing second in 1926. He was part of the Argentina squad for the 1930 FIFA World Cup but he only played in one game, against France.

Muttis retired in 1932 but came out of retirement in 1936 to play for Argentinos Juniors. He went on to become player-manager of Almagro leading them to the 2nd Division championship in 1937 and in 1940 he was the manager of the Argentinos Juniors squad that won the 2nd division championship.

Titles

Club
 Boca Juniors
 Primera División (5): 1923, 1924, 1926, 1930, 1931
 Copa Ibarguren (2): 1923, 1924
 Copa de Competencia Jockey Club (1): 1925
 Copa Estímulo (1): 1926
 Copa de Honor Cousenier (1): 1920

National team
Argentina
 Copa América (1): 1925

References

External links

 Informe Xeneize profile

1899 births
1955 deaths
Argentine people of Italian descent
Footballers from Buenos Aires
Argentine footballers
Argentina international footballers
1930 FIFA World Cup players
Association football defenders
Club Atlético Atlanta footballers
Boca Juniors footballers
Argentinos Juniors footballers
Club Almagro players
Argentine Primera División players
Argentine football managers
Almagro managers
Argentinos Juniors managers